Strategy is a Canadian business magazine about marketing, advertising and media. The magazine is published by Brunico Communications, and was launched in 1989.

It was merged in 2016 with Marketing, a formerly competing title which Brunico acquired from Rogers Media.

References

External links

Magazines established in 1989
1989 establishments in Canada
Business magazines published in Canada
Magazines published in Toronto